Thailand participated at the 2015 Summer Universiade, in Gwangju, South Korea.

Medals by sport

Medalists

References
 Thailand Overview

Nations at the 2015 Summer Universiade
Thailand at the Summer Universiade
2015 in Thai sport